The World of the Dark Crystal is a companion book written in conjunction with the film The Dark Crystal. The book was designed and edited by Rupert Brown, with illustrations by Brian Froud—who was the conceptual designer for the film—and text by J. J. Llewellyn. It was originally published in 1982 by Alfred A. Knopf, Inc. In 2003 the book was re-released by Harry N. Abrams, Inc.

The book gives background information for the film and contains many sketches and art concepts drawn by Brian Froud. It is in this book that the names of the Skeksis, the urRu, the urSkeks, and many of the creatures created in The Dark Crystal are introduced.

Contents
The book purports to be Aughra's account of the film's backstory, interspersed with in-universe descriptions of various props and their roles in the fictional universe itself. Among the concepts explored are numerology and symbology, and periodic references to Aughra's origin.

Awards and honors
The book was a finalist for the 1983 Hugo Award for Best Non-Fiction Book.

Rerelease
In the 2003 edition of the book, a small pamphlet titled "The Crystal" is included. This was the original concept design and story pitched to financial backers before the film went into full production. Four years after "The Crystal" was created, the film was released in theatres.

References

1982 books
The Dark Crystal
Fantasy books
Alfred A. Knopf books